(Dates in italics indicate de facto continuation of office)

Note: currently, the prefect is not the true departmental head, which is the President of the General Council. The prefect is merely the representative of the national government.

Ancien regime
Governors under the Ancien Régime were:

Revolution and First Empire

Restoration, Second Republic, Second Empire

Third, Fourth, Fifth republics

Notes

Sources

 
Guadeloupe

Colonial and Departmental Heads